Zhenge (died 1327) was an empress consort of the Yuan dynasty, married to Külüg Khan (Emperor Wuzong). 

She was daughter of Bengbula and granddaughter of Tuolian, both notable commanders from Khongirad tribe. Her aunt Tegülün Khatun was married to Kublai. She had a brother called Maizhuhan. 

She was created empress by Külüg in 1310. She had no children and left the palace in 1313 to become a bhikkuni. 

She died in November 1327 and was interred together with her late husband. She was posthumously given name Empress Xuān Cí Huì Shèng by Yesün Temür.

References

Sources 

 

1327 deaths
Year of birth missing
14th-century Mongolian women
Yuan dynasty empresses
14th-century Chinese women
14th-century Chinese people
14th-century Buddhist nuns